Murray station may refer to:

Transportation 
 Murray Bridge railway station, a railway station in Murray Bridge, South Australia
 Murray station (FrontRunner), a commuter rail station in Murray, Utah, United States
 Murray Central station, a light rail station in Murray, Utah, United States
 Murray North station, a light rail station in Murray, Utah, United States
 Mount Murray railway station, a former railway station in New South Wales, Australia

Power generation 
 Murray Hydroelectric Power Station, two generating stations near the Khancoban, New South Wales, Australia
 Sidney A. Murray Jr. Hydroelectric Station, near Vidalia, Louisiana, United States

See also
 Murray Hill station
 Murray (disambiguation)